Accidental Co-Traveller is a Croatian drama film directed by Srećko Jurdana. It was released in 2004.

Cast
 Dora Fišter - Vanja Barbarić
 Cintija Ašperger - Greta
 Zlatko Ožbolt - Ivan Puzina
 Ante Prkačin - Svecenik
 Nenad Cvetko - Srdjan
 Božidar Orešković - Mrazovic
 Milan Štrljić - Adalbertov otac
 Božidarka Frajt - Gretina majka
 Matija Prskalo - Dadilja
 Vlasta Knezović - Vanjina mama
 Edo Vujić - Vanjin otac
 Duško Gruborović - Krolo
 Dominik Lovrić - Adalbert

External links
 

2004 films
2000s Croatian-language films
2004 drama films
Croatian drama films